Paraphisis is a genus of bush crickets in the subfamily Meconematinae.

Species in this genus are found in Australia and Papua New Guinea.

Species
The Catalogue of Life lists the following:

References

Meconematinae
Orthoptera genera